Kazakhstan competed at the 2016 Winter Youth Olympics in Lillehammer, Norway from 12 to 21 February 2016.

Medalists

Medalists in mixed NOCs events

Alpine skiing

Girls

Biathlon

Boys

Girls

Mixed

Cross-country skiing

Boys

Girls

Figure skating

Singles

Freestyle skiing

Ski cross

Luge

Individual sleds

Mixed team relay

Ski jumping

Short track speed skating

Boys

Girls

Mixed team relay

Qualification Legend: FA=Final A (medal); FB=Final B (non-medal); FC=Final C (non-medal); FD=Final D (non-medal); SA/B=Semifinals A/B; SC/D=Semifinals C/D; ADV=Advanced to Next Round; PEN=Penalized

Speed skating

Boys

Girls

Mixed team sprint

See also
Kazakhstan at the 2016 Summer Olympics

References

2016 in Kazakhstani sport
Nations at the 2016 Winter Youth Olympics
Kazakhstan at the Youth Olympics